This is a list of the 72 Members of Parliament (MPs) elected to the House of Commons of the United Kingdom by Scottish constituencies for the Forty-Ninth parliament of the United Kingdom (1983 to 1987) at the 1983 United Kingdom general election.

Composition

List

See also 

 Lists of MPs for constituencies in Scotland

Lists of UK MPs 1983–1987
Lists of MPs for constituencies in Scotland
1983 United Kingdom general election